The Battle of Coffeeville, fought December 5, 1862, was a military engagement of the American Civil War fought near Coffeeville, Mississippi.

Background

By November 1862, Northern Mississippi was securely in the hands of the Union army after key, yet costly, wins at Shiloh, Iuka, and Corinth. General Ulysses S. Grant began the Mississippi Central Railroad Campaign, an overland push (following the main rail line through the heart of Mississippi, capturing the towns and rail along the way) into Mississippi with the goal of capturing Vicksburg in conjunction with General William Tecumseh Sherman, who would follow the river route South.

After being defeated at the Battle of Corinth, Major General Earl Van Dorn's Confederate Army of West Tennessee was on the retreat. At the battle of Hatchie's Bridge, Van Dorn successfully evaded the army's capture by the Union. The Confederate army kept falling back through Oxford and then Coffeeville, constantly skirmishing with pursuing Union cavalry, who were ahead of Grant's column.

Order of battle

Abbreviations used
 MG = Major General
 BG = Brigadier General
 Col = Colonel
 Ltc = Lieutenant Colonel
 Maj = Major
 Cpt = Captain

Union
Cavalry, Army of the Tennessee – Col Theophilus Lyle Dickey

Confederate
1st Corps, Army of West Tennessee – MG Mansfield Lovell

The battle

Outside of Coffeeville, the Confederate command decided to ambush the harassing enemy cavalry. On December 5, under the command of Brigadier General Lloyd Tilghman, the men of Baldwin, Tilghman and Rust's brigades with artillery and support from W. H. Jackson's units, hid on a wooded ridge alongside the Water Valley-Coffeeville Road.

Around 2:30 pm, the Union Cavalry (led by Colonel Theophilus Lyle Dickey) approached Coffeeville within one mile. When the Cavalry was within 50 yards of the Confederate positions, it was fired upon by artillery, followed by volleys of infantry fire. After a skirmish, the Confederates pushed the Union Cavalry back about three miles to the head of Grant's column. The pursuit halted and the Confederates returned to the ambush site. The Union Cavalry retreated to Water Valley. The fighting lasted from around 4 pm until dark.
The Battle of Coffeeville brought Grant's Mississippi invasion via Tennessee to a halt. He pulled his army back to Oxford.

References

1862 in the American Civil War
1862 in Mississippi
Confederate victories of the American Civil War
Battles of the American Civil War in Mississippi
December 1862 events
Yalobusha County, Mississippi